Don Diego and Pelagia is a 1928 Soviet silent comedy drama directed by Yakov Protazanov.

The film's art direction was by Sergei Kozlovsky.

Plot
Head of a small railway station Yakov Ivanovich Golovach is obsessed with reading historical novels about knights. Fancying himself as the hero of one book – Don Diego, he loves to fight with an imaginary opponent. He is caught in the act by the female residents of the surrounding villages who came to the station of the arriving mail train in order to sell their simple culinary creations

Laughter of the peasant women drives Yakov Ivanovich furious. In a rage he orders to detain violators of the railway rules who are crossing the railway line. But he only manages to catch the dawdling old woman Pelageya Diomina ...

Cast
 Mariya Blyumental-Tamarina as Pelageya Diomina  
 Anatoliy Bykov as 'Don Diego', station master  
 Vladimir Mikhaylov as Pelageya's husband  
 I. Levkoyeva as Natasha, member Komsomol  
 Ivan Yudin as Misha, cell secretary Komsomol  
 Vladimir Popov as Miroshka, guard Volispolkom  
 Daniil Vvedenskiy as Night watcher  
 Aleksandr Gromov as Uchraspred  
 Mikhail Zharov as himself  
 B. Gusiev as Militia man  
 Yelena Tyapkina as Pope's Wife  
 Ivan Pelttser as Bureaucrat  
 Sergei Tsenin as Bureaucrat  
 Osip Brik as Bureaucrat  
 Nikolay Ivakin as Cooperative Shop Employee  
 Lev Fenin as Postman's Guest  
 Vera Maretskaya as Girl in trial 
 Sofya Levitina as Woman in Jail  
 Andrei Gorchilin 
 Chuveliov

References

Bibliography 
 Christie, Ian & Taylor, Richard. The Film Factory: Russian and Soviet Cinema in Documents 1896-1939. Routledge, 2012.

External links 
 

1928 films
1928 comedy-drama films
Soviet comedy-drama films
Russian comedy-drama films
Soviet silent films
1920s Russian-language films
Films directed by Yakov Protazanov
Soviet black-and-white films
Russian black-and-white films
Silent comedy-drama films